Soheil Muhsin Afnan (b. 1904 - d. 1990) was a scholar of Philosophy, Arabic, Persian, and Greek whose intellectual works included translations of Greek texts into Persian as well as the publication of philosophical lexicons.

Background and family
Afnan was born in Palestine to a prominent Baháʼí lineage.  His parents were Mírzá Muḥsin Afnán, a cousin of the Báb, and Túbá Khánum.   His maternal grandparents were ʻAbdu'l-Bahá, the son of and successor to the Baháʼí Faith founder-prophet Baháʼu'lláh, and Munirih Khánum.  Afnan received his initial education at the LaSallian Collège des Frères in Haifa and later at the American University of Beirut, where he would graduate in 1923.  He would continue to the Sorbonne and Oxford University but financial constraints imposed due to the death of his father as well as the onset of World War II curtailed his studies at those institutions.  Despite having been declared a Covenant-breaker by  his first cousin Shoghi Effendi, the Guardian of the Baháʼí Faith, in 1971 Afnan established a scholarship, the Fuad Muhsin Afnan Memorial Fund, for "Bahai students in need" at the American University of Beirut in honor of his younger brother who died in 1941 during an aerial bombardment in London where he was volunteering as an Air Raid Warden. Afnan never married and did not have any children.

Academic career
In 1947, Afnan produced the first direct translation of Aristotle's Poetics from the Greek into Persian. Upon seeing this work, the Iranian poet Mehdi Akhavan-Sales serialized this translation in the literary magazine Iran-e Ma (Our Iran), of which he was the editor. He praised Afnan with a poem published at the end of the series which was also published in his 1951 collection Arghanoon (ارغنون), which literally translates as Organon.

Afnan obtained his PhD from Pembroke College, Cambridge in 1956, and was a lecturer in Persian at the University of Cambridge from 1958 to 1961, where he collaborated with Arthur John Arberry. He continued to produce academic works, including translations and lexicons of philosophical terminology.  As late as 2006, Seyyed Hossein Nasr noted in his work Islamic Philosophy from Its Origin to the Present, that "There is not in fact even one satisfactory philosophical dictionary of Arabic and Persian terms with English equivalents. The only work of this kind available is that of Suhail Afnan, A Philosophical Lexicon in Persian and Arabic (Dar al Mashreq, Beirut, 1969).  This work is, however, far from being adequate, especially as far as technical vocabulary of later schools of Islamic philosophy is concerned."

Afnan passed away in 1990 in Istanbul where he was conducting research at the Topkapı Palace library.

Selected publications
 The Poetics of Aristotle. Translated from Greek to Persian. Luzac & Co., London, 1948
 The Persai. Translated from Greek into Persian. Adrien Maisonneuve, Paris, 1952
 Lexique des Termes de Logique en Grec, Anglais, Francais, Persan et Arab. Mimiographiee, Paris, 1954
 Avicenna, His Life and Work. George Allen and Unwin, London, 1958
 Philosophical Terminology in Arabic and Persian. E.J. Brill, 1964
 A Philosophical Lexicon in Persian and Arabic. Imprimerie Catholique, Beirut, 1968
 A Philosophical Lexicon in Persian and Arabic. Dar El-Mashreq, Beirut, 1969
 Dar Peyeh Khoshi: Short stories in Persian. Dar El-Mashreq, Beirut, 1971 
 Concerning Dari Persian. Imprimerie Catholique, Beirut, 1973
 Concerning Dari Persian. Dar El-Mashreq, Beirut, 1973
 Payameh Soroush: Two plays in Persian. Aarash, Stockholm, 1998

Notes

American University of Beirut alumni
Family of Baháʼu'lláh
Palestinian academics
1904 births
1990 deaths
Persian translators
Greek scholars
Philosophy academics
Alumni of Pembroke College, Cambridge
Academics of the University of Cambridge
History of the Bahá'í Faith
20th-century Bahá'ís
People from the Ottoman Empire of Iranian descent
20th-century Iranian people
20th-century translators